Pihen-lès-Guînes is a commune in the Pas-de-Calais department in the Hauts-de-France region of France.

Geography
Pihen-lès-Guînes is located 7 miles (11 km) southwest of Calais, at the junction of the D243 and D244 roads. Pihen station has rail connections to Calais and Boulogne-sur-Mer.

History
The name of Pihen appeared for the first time in the founding charter of the abbey of Andres in 1084, in the form of Pithem, from the Germanic pit (wells ) + Heim (home, village), which became Pihen in the Calaisis and Boulonnais dialect, but -hem elsewhere.
Pihem (near to Wizernes) is almost the same as Pihen, which led to so many errors with the mail that the commune decided to add ‘lès-Guînes’ to its name in 1923.

There is no doubt that the village is very old. Tombs have been discovered dating back to the medieval period, including shaped sarcophagi and skeletons buried directly in the chalk. Ancient thick, handmade tiles are repeatedly lifted to the surface of fields during ploughing.
Mammoth tusks and the skull of a woolly rhinoceros were uncovered during the construction of a departmental road.

In the early Middle Ages, Pihen was part of the county of Guînes then English from 1347 until 1558, when like all of the Calaisis, it was liberated by Francis, Duke of Guise, in 1558.
The tribulations of Pihen were not over, however. At that time, the kings of France and Spain were at war and the territory of Pihen was in the combat zone, the Spaniards from neighbouring Flanders possessed the commune in 1596, lost it, but regained it in 1598. Most of the thirteenth century church was burnt down during this time.

Population

Places of interest
 The church of the Annunciation dating from the thirteenth century.
 The nineteenth century château de La Quennevacherie.

See also
Communes of the Pas-de-Calais department

References

Pihenlesguines
Pale of Calais